The traditional Chinese holidays are an essential part of harvests or prayer offerings. The most important Chinese holiday is the Chinese New Year (Spring Festival), which is also celebrated in overseas ethnic Chinese communities (for example in Malaysia, Thailand or the USA). Traditional holidays are varied from region to region but all scheduled according to the Chinese calendar (except the Qing Ming and Winter Solstice days, falling on the respective Jie qi in the Agricultural calendar).

Public holidays
Traditional holidays are generally celebrated in Chinese-speaking regions. For the most part however, only Chinese New Year, Qingming Festival, the Dragon Boat Festival and Mid-Autumn Festival are statutory public holidays. This is the case in both mainland China and Taiwan whilst Hong Kong and Macau also observe Buddha's Birthday and Chung Yeung Festival. In Singapore, Chinese New Year is the only traditional Chinese public holiday, likewise with Malaysia.

Each region has its own holidays on top of this condensed traditional Chinese set. Mainland China and Taiwan observe patriotic holidays, Hong Kong and Macau observe Christian holidays, and Malaysia and Singapore celebrate Malay and Indian festivals.
 Public holidays in the People's Republic of China
 Holidays in Hong Kong
 Holidays in Macau
 Public holidays in the Republic of China 
 Holidays in Taiwan (including unofficial holidays)
 Holidays in Singapore
 Holidays in Malaysia
 List of festivals in China

See also
Jingchu Suishiji, an important text on the transition from ancient Chinese festivals to the present traditional ones
Culture of China
List of annual events in China

References

External links
 Traditional Chinese festivals on china.org.cn

Chinese culture

Public holidays in China
Traditional holidays